Sir Richard Ingoldsby (1617–1685) was an English army officer and regicide.

Richard Ingoldsby may also refer to:
 Sir Richard Ingoldsby (knighted 1617), English landowner, father of the above
 Richard Ingoldsby (British Army officer, died 1712), British Army lieutenant-general, grandson of the above and nephew of the regicide
 Richard Ingoldesby (died 1719), British Army colonel and lieutenant-governor of New York
 Richard Ingoldsby (British Army officer, died 1759), British Army brigadier-general, great-grandson of the regicide